This is a list of events and medallists at the 2007 Canada Games.

Alpine skiing

Archery

Artistic gymnastics

Badminton

Biathlon

Boxing

Medal summary

Cross-country skiing

Curling

Fencing

Medal summary

Men's events

Women's events

Figure skating

Freestyle skiing

Ice hockey

Judo

Men

Women

Team competition

Ringette

Shooting

Snowboarding (exhibition)

Parallel giant slalom

Speed skating

Long track

Short track

Squash

Synchronised swimming

Medal summary

Table tennis

Medal summary

Wheelchair basketball

Mixed Mix

2007 Canada Winter Games